MV Maid of Skelmorlie was a passenger ferry operated by Caledonian Steam Packet Company from 1953. Rendered redundant by the car ferry revolution, she was sold to Italian owners in 1973. After conversion to stern-loading, she operated, as Ala in the Bay of Naples for 20 years.

History
Maid of Skelmorlie was the third of a quartet of passenger vessels ordered in 1951 to modernise the Clyde fleet, the second to be built by A & J Inglis of Pointhouse.

In September 1969, she was fitted out for the winter Kyles of Bute/Tarbert mail run from Gourock, acquiring small mail rooms forward of her saloon, and a temporary shelter over the galley for parcels and luggage. CSP took over this historic route from David MacBrayne from 1 October 1969. Her sister,  was similarly modified.

Layout
MV Maid of Skelmorlie had a forward observation lounge and an aft tearoom, both with large windows. A lower deck lounge was later converted to a bar. Open deck space available for passengers was limited. The bridge was forward on the promenade deck, with a landing platform above, for use at very low tides. She had two masts and a single funnel, above the central engines, with the galley aft.

Between 1973 and 1976, she was converted to a stern-loading ferry.

Service
MV Maid of Skelmorlie initially assisted  on Gourock – Rothesay duties and developed the afternoon cruise programme. She often did Wemyss Bay – Innellan runs and, on Mondays and Fridays took late afternoon sailing from Craigendoran to Rothesay. She ran various weekend connections to Tighnabruaich and a Saturday cruise to Lochgoilhead/Arrochar. She became increasingly associated with Wemyss Bay and Largs and their connexions to Rothesay and Millport.

In the late 1950s, the Maids lost their fixed routes and all operated across the Clyde network. They became progressively redundant as the car ferry revolution swept all before it. Maid of Skelmorlie spent more and more time laid up and was finally withdrawn at the end of the 1972 season and never wore the CalMac colours.

In April 1973, she was sold to an Italian concern and sailed for the Mediterranean. She was converted to a stern-loading car ferry, and renamed the Ala. She had considerable success operating in the Bay of Naples, maintaining the Sorrento to Capri route for almost twenty years from early 1976. After the 1995 season, the Ala was laid up and took various charters: from 1997 to 1999 a winter cargo service to the Tremiti Islands in the Adriatic and in the summer of 2001 between Pozzuoli and the island of Procida, in the company of Capri Express, (ex ).  As late as 2004 she provided scheduled ferry service between Naples and Sorrento for the Navigazione Libera del Golfo line. As of October 2014, she was laid up at the San Vincenzo wharf in central Naples.

References

External links
Website for MV Maid of Skelmorlie

Caledonian MacBrayne
Ferries of Scotland
1953 ships